The 2019–20 GFA Premier League was the 36th season of the GFA Premier League, the top division football competition in Grenada. Instead of a normal league competition, a cup competition, branded as the 2020 GFA Club Championship was played. The season began on 4 January 2020 and was scheduled to end on 22 March 2020, but was postponed for five months due to the COVID-19 pandemic. The final rounds of the season were played from 15 August 2020 until 29 August 2020.

Participating teams

Group stage

Group A 
 1.Hurricanes SC                  3   3  0  0  14- 1   9  Qualified
 - - - - - - - - - - - - - - - - - - - - - - - - - - - -
 2.Queens Park Rangers FC 1969    3   2  0  1  14- 7   6
 3.St. Andrew's Football League   3   1  0  2   7-10   3
 4.Tempe All Blacks               3   0  0  3   0-17   0

Group B 
 1.Grenada Boys Secondary School  3   2  1  0  13- 2   7  Qualified
 - - - - - - - - - - - - - - - - - - - - - - - - - - - -
 2.FC Camerhogne                  3   2  1  0   8- 2   7
 3.Sunjets                        2   0  0  2   1- 7   0
 4.Five Stars                     2   0  0  2   1-12   0

Group C 
 1.Fontenoy United                3   3  0  0   9- 2   9  Qualified
 - - - - - - - - - - - - - - - - - - - - - - - - - - - -
 2.Combined Northerners           3   2  0  1  13- 3   6
 3.Morne Jaloux                   3   1  0  2   4-12   3
 4.Mount Rich SC                  3   0  0  3   1-10   0

Group D 
 1.Shamrock                       2   2  0  0  10- 2   6  Qualified
 - - - - - - - - - - - - - - - - - - - - - - - - - - - -
 2.Springs                        2   1  0  1   4- 8   3
 3.Royal Grenada Police Force     2   0  0  2   1- 5   0
 -.Paradise FC International      withdrew

Group E 
 1.SAB Spartans SC                3   2  1  0  12- 6   7  Qualified
 - - - - - - - - - - - - - - - - - - - - - - - - - - - -
 2.Happy Hill SC                  3   2  0  1  10- 7   6
 3.Honved                         3   1  0  2  11-10   3
 4.St. David's FC                 3   0  1  2   4-14   1

Group F 
 1.Eagles Super Strikers          3   3  0  0  14- 7   9  Qualified
 - - - - - - - - - - - - - - - - - - - - - - - - - - - -
 2.Grenada U-17                   2   1  0  1   4- 2   3
 3.North Stars                    3   1  0  2   4- 7   3
 4.Carenage                       2   0  0  2   4-10   0

Group G 
 1.Hard Rock FC                   2   2  0  0   4- 0   6  Qualified
 - - - - - - - - - - - - - - - - - - - - - - - - - - - -
 2.Grenada U-20                   2   1  0  1   2- 2   3
 3.Christian Strikers             2   0  0  2   1- 5   0
NB: a fourth team was to be invited for this group but apparently no
    interested club could be found

Group H 
 1.St. John's Sports              3   3  0  0  28- 2   9  Qualified
 - - - - - - - - - - - - - - - - - - - - - - - - - - - -
 2.Chantimelle                    3   2  0  1  11- 3   6
 3.Mt. Horne Sports Club          2   0  0  2   1- 8   0
 4.Belle Vue Rangers              2   0  0  2   0-27   0

Knock-out stage

Bracket

Quarterfinals 
First legs played on 14–15 February 2020, second legs played on 28–29 February 2020.

|}

Semifinals 
First legs played on 15–16 August 2020, second legs played on 22–23 August 2020. All matches played at the Kirani James Athletic Stadium.

|}

Third place match

Final

References

External links
Grenada Football Association

2019–20
Grenada
1